Keith Arbuthnot may refer to:
 Sir Keith Arbuthnot, 8th Baronet
 Keith Arbuthnott, 15th Viscount of Arbuthnott, Major General, (1897–1966)